The Guards Cuirassiers were a heavy cavalry regiment of the Royal Prussian Army. Formed in 1815 as an Uhlans regiment, it was reorganized as a cuirassiers unit in 1821. The regiment was part of the Guards Cavalry Division and fought in the Second Schleswig War, the Austro-Prussian War, the Franco-Prussian War and World War I. The regiment was disbanded in September 1919.

See also
List of Imperial German cavalry regiments

References

External links
http://www.kuerassierregimenter.de/ 

Guards cavalry regiments of the Prussian Army
Military units and formations established in 1815
Military units and formations disestablished in 1919
Royal guards
1815 establishments in Prussia